Dagfinn Loen is a former Norwegian curler.

Following retirement he became the vice-president of the Norwegian Curling Association.().

Teams

References

External links
 
 
 

Norwegian male curlers
European curling champions